Phil Parry is a Welsh freelance journalist and author formerly of BBC Cymru Wales. His work has appeared on BBC Wales Panorama, and Newsnight, and he was a presenter on the Welsh current affairs programme Week In, Week Out. He currently runs the online investigative website "The Eye".

Career 
Parry joined BBC Wales in 1987 where for ten years he was a reporter for Week in Week Out.

He later presented BBC Radio Wales news programmes.

The 2003 BBC Wales Panorama programme "Fair Cops", presented by Parry, questioned the police investigation of Clydach murderer David Morris. South Wales Police Detective Inspector Shane Ahmed sued the BBC for defamation, and won an out of court settlement. The programme won a BAFTA Cymru award for best current affairs programme in 2004.

In 2010, he left the BBC. Since then, he has been a freelance journalist and launched his own investigative website "The Eye" in 2011.

In 2019, he wrote and published the book "A Good Story", giving an account of his career in journalism, and his difficulties with hereditary spastic paraplegia.

References

External links
The Eye Wales

Welsh autobiographers
Welsh television presenters
BBC Cymru Wales newsreaders and journalists
Welsh journalists
Welsh television journalists
Living people
Year of birth missing (living people)